The men's 110 metres hurdles event at the 1975 Pan American Games was held in Mexico City on 15 and 16 October.

Medalists

Results

Heats

Wind:Heat 1: 0.0 m/s, Heat 2: -3.0 m/s

Final
Wind: 0.0 m/s

References

Athletics at the 1975 Pan American Games
1975